Kalana Lanette Greene (born July 13, 1987), is an American professional women's basketball guard, who last played for the Minnesota Lynx of the Women's National Basketball Association (WNBA), and CCC Polkowice in Poland. She played her college career at the University of Connecticut, where the Huskies were the 2009 and 2010 NCAA national Champions.

Early life and high school
Greene grew up in St. Stephen, South Carolina, as the daughter of Addison and Cynthia Greene. Greene played basketball for Timberland High School in St. Stephen, South Carolina. She helped her team win twenty or more games for three consecutive seasons, and in her senior year, she led the team to its first ever state championship. She averaged 17 points per game as a freshman; by the time she was a senior, she averaged 28 points, 18 rebounds, nine steals and eight assists per game.

Greene was named a WBCA All-American. She participated in the 2005 WBCA High School All-America Game, where she scored four points.

College

Greene's choices came down to Georgia and Connecticut. She liked the Georgia program, but the UConn program, with both a family atmosphere and an expectation you have to work hard for everything you get swayed her to choose to come to join the University of Connecticut Huskies.

Greene suffered a major knee injury in a game on December 17, 2007, against South Carolina, an injury that would end her season. It turned out to be a damaged ACL and torn LCL. UConn rarely played South Carolina, but set up a two-game series, with a game in 2007 against South Carolina in Connecticut, with a return trip to South Carolina in 2008, scheduled so that Greene could play in her home state as a senior. Her coach, Geno Auriemma, worried it might be a career-ending injury. 

She worked hard to rehabilitate her knee, including staying on campus over the summer to work out in the gym every day. She played the following season, for a team that won the national championship, although not at the same level as before her injury. During the year, she had to make a decision whether to leave as an academic senior, or return for a fifth year. Players who are injured during a year can get an additional year of eligibility, if they have not played too many games in the season. Greene's injury occurred in the eighth game of her junior season, so she was eligible to return if she chose. She considered her options, and chose to return for a fifth year.

On March 9, 2010, Greene played in her 151st game as a UConn Husky, more than any other player in UConn Women's basketball history, breaking the mark held by Renee Montgomery. Greene played in 157 games in her complete college career, an NCAA record.

Greene helped lead UConn to the Championship of the Big East Tournament, and earned Most Outstanding Player of the tournament for her performance.

WNBA
Greene was the 13th overall selection in the 2010 WNBA Draft, selected by the New York Liberty. After playing one season for the Liberty, she was traded to the Connecticut Sun for the draft rights of Sydney Colson, the Texas A&M selected by the Sun in the second round of the 2011 WNBA draft.

WNBA career statistics

Regular season

|-
| align="left" | 2010
| align="left" | New York
| 33 || 0 || 15.7 || .464 || .333 || .625 || 1.6 || 0.9 || 0.4 || 0.2 || 1.1 || 4.5
|-
| align="left" | 2011
| align="left" | Connecticut
| 33 || 33 || 23.7 || .422 || .391 || .600 || 3.8 || 1.5 || 0.9 || 0.4 || 0.9 || 5.6
|-
| align="left" | 2012
| align="left" | Connecticut
| 34 || 31 || 17.8 || .438 || .227 || .696 || 1.9 || 1.7 || 1.1 || 0.2 || 0.8 || 4.2
|-
| align="left" | 2013
| align="left" | Connecticut
| 34 || 31 || 26.1 || .407 || .154 || .732 || 3.7 || 1.5 || 1.1 || 0.4 || 1.1 || 5.1
|-
| align="left" | 2014
| align="left" | Washington
| 20 || 0 || 3.9 || .400 || .000 || .750 || 0.6 || 0.1 || 0.4 || 0.0 || 0.0 || 0.8
|-
| align="left" | 2015
| align="left" | San Antonio
| 11 || 6 || 19.9 || .365 || .154 || 1.000 || 2.9 || 0.7 || 0.7 || 0.3 || 0.3 || 4.4
|-
|style="text-align:left;background:#afe6ba;"|  2015†
| align="left" | Minnesota
| 2 || 0 || 12.0 || .000 || .000 || .667 || 1.5 || 1.5 || 0.5 || 0.0 || 0.0 || 2.0
|-
| align="left" | Career
| align="left" | 6 years, 5 teams
| 167 || 101 || 18.6 || .422 || .275 || .684 || 2.5 || 1.2 || 0.8 || 0.3 || 0.8 || 4.3

Playoffs

|-
| align="left" | 2010
| align="left" | New York
| 5 || 0 || 3.0 || .200 || .000 || .500 || 0.4 || 0.0 || 0.0 || 0.0 || 0.0 || 0.6
|-
| align="left" | 2011
| align="left" | Connecticut
| 2 || 2 || 22.0 || .389 || .600 || 1.000 || 2.0 || 1.0 || 1.5 || 1.0 || 1.5 || 9.5
|-
| align="left" | 2012
| align="left" | Connecticut
| 5 || 5 || 12.2 || .286 || .000 || 1.000 || 2.2 || 0.2 || 0.2 || 0.4 || 1.0 || 1.8
|-
| align="left" | 2014
| align="left" | Washington
| 2 || 0 || 7.0 || .500 || 1.000 || .500 || 0.5 || 0.0 || 0.0 || 0.0 || 0.0 || 2.0
|-
| align="left" | Career
| align="left" | 4 years, 3 teams
| 14 || 7 || 9.6 || .333 || .444 || .714 || 1.3 || 0.2 || 0.3 || 0.3 || 0.6 || 2.5

Europe
Greene plays for CCC Polkowice in Poland – silver medalist of the PLKK 2010/2011 season.

Awards and honors

 WBCA All-American.
 Kalana Greene All-BIG EAST First Team
 Kalana Greene Big East Tournament Most Outstanding Player

University of Connecticut statistics

See also
 List of Connecticut women's basketball players with 1000 points
 2008–09 Connecticut Huskies women's basketball team
 2009–10 Connecticut Huskies women's basketball team

References

1987 births
Living people
American women's basketball players
Basketball players from South Carolina
Connecticut Sun players
Minnesota Lynx players
New York Liberty draft picks
New York Liberty players
Parade High School All-Americans (girls' basketball)
People from St. Stephen, South Carolina
San Antonio Stars players
UConn Huskies women's basketball players
Washington Mystics players
Guards (basketball)